Qadi Heyat Mahmud (1693–1760) was a medieval Bengali poet, mystic and judge. Although his works, like other Middle Bengali poetry, are religion-centric, they are marked by social consciousness and tolerance, and contain many Rangpuri dialectic features. Mahmud is considered to be the last poet of Middle Bengali literature, and his lifespan directly ends shortly after the British East India Company's victory at the Battle of Plassey.

Early life and career 
Mahmud was born in 1693, to a Bengali Muslim family in the village of Jharbishila in Sarkar Ghoraghat, Bengal Subah, Mughal Empire. His father, Shah Kabir, was the Dewan of Ghoraghat and a poet in his spare time. His mother's name was Khairunnesa. Due to this, Mahmud was able to be employed by the Sarkar as a Qadi (Muslim judge).

Literary career 
Mahmud has written four poetry compositions. As a resident of Ghoraghat, his works have strong influences from the Rangpuri dialect and the Persian-influenced Dobhashi register. His earliest found book, titled Jangnāmā (1723), narrates the Battle of Karbala in zari style. In 1732, he wrote Sarbabhedbāṇī which contains proverbial statements. He collected the material from Mafrehul Qulub, a Persian translation of the  Panchatantra. Shabnam Begum refers to the book as Chittya-Uththan and claims that it was a Persian translation of the Hitopadesha. Hitaggyānbāṇī was composed in 1753, and explores Islamic ethics. Mahmud's magnum opus Āmbiyābāṇī (1758) covers the Stories of The Prophets from Adam to Muhammad.

Death and legacy 
Mahmud died on 17 February, presumably in the year 1760. He was buried in a mazar (mausoleum) in his home village, Jharbishila. Every year since then, his urs is commemorated by the locals. His works became known to the mainstream through the efforts of Maulvi Mansuruddin.

A memorial center has been set up at the initiative of the Dinajpur District Council. In Mahmud's honour, a building of the Begum Rokeya University was named Kabi Heyat Mahmud Bhaban.

Notes

References

Further reading 
 

Bengali poets
1760 deaths
1693 births
18th-century Bengali poets
People from Dinajpur District, Bangladesh
18th-century Indian Muslims
Qadis
Bengali Muslims